Reighton is a village and civil parish, in the Scarborough district of North Yorkshire, England.

From the mediaeval era until the 19th century Reighton was part of Dickering Wapentake. Between 1894 and 1974 Reighton was a part of the Bridlington Rural District, in the East Riding of Yorkshire.

According to the 2011 UK census, Reighton parish had a population of 407, an increase on the 2001 UK census figure of 387. The parish also includes the nearby village of Speeton.

Notable people
Hugh Edwin Strickland

References

External links

Villages in North Yorkshire
Civil parishes in North Yorkshire